Hans Jørgen Garde (22 January 1939 in Frederiksberg – 3 August 1996 on Vágar, Faroe Islands) was a Danish admiral.

Garde was the Danish Chief of Defence from 1 April 1996 until his death. Garde died when the Gulfstream III he was travelling in with his wife, Anna Garde, crashed during final approach to Vágar Airport in bad weather and poor visibility. He was the first foreigner to be awarded the gold medal of the United States Naval Institute.

Awards and decorations

See also
Vágar Airport:Accidents and incidents

References

External links 
 Obituary in Danish
 Aviation Safety Net record of the plane crash

1939 births
1996 deaths
Danish admirals
Garde, J
Victims of aviation accidents or incidents in the Faroe Islands